The 8th Magritte Awards ceremony, presented by the Académie André Delvaux, honored the best films of 2017 in Belgium and took place on 3 February 2018 at the Square in the historic site of Mont des Arts, Brussels, beginning at 8:45 p.m. CET. During the ceremony, the Académie André Delvaux presented Magritte Awards in 22 categories. The ceremony was televised in Belgium by La Deux, after RTBF took over broadcast rights from BeTV. Actress Natacha Régnier presided the ceremony, while Fabrizio Rongione hosted the show for the third time.

The nominees for the 8th Magritte Awards were announced on 11 January 2018. Films with the most nominations were A Wedding with eight, followed by This Is Our Land with seven and Insyriated with six. The winners were announced during the awards ceremony on February 3, 2018. Insyriated won six awards, including Best Film and Best Director for Philippe Van Leeuw. Other multiple winners were A Wedding and Raw with two awards each.

Winners and nominees

Best Film
 Insyriated
 Blind Spot (Dode Hoek)
 Lost in Paris (Paris pieds nus)
 This Is Our Land (Chez nous)
 A Wedding (Noces)

Best Director
 Philippe Van Leeuw – Insyriated
 Lucas Belvaux – This Is Our Land (Chez nous)
 Nabil Ben Yadir – Blind Spot (Dode Hoek)
 Stephan Streker – A Wedding (Noces)

Best Actor
 Peter Van den Begin – King of the Belgians
 François Damiens –  Just to Be Sure (Ôtez-moi d'un Doute)
 Jérémie Renier – L'Amant double
 Matthias Schoenaerts – Racer and the Jailbird (Le Fidèle)

Best Actress
 Émilie Dequenne – This Is Our Land (Chez nous)
 Cécile de France – Just to Be Sure (Ôtez-moi d'un Doute)
 Lucie Debay – King of the Belgians
 Fiona Gordon – Lost in Paris (Paris pieds nus)

Best Supporting Actor
 Jean-Benoît Ugeux – Racer and the Jailbird (Le Fidèle)
 Laurent Capelluto – Don't Tell Her (Faut pas lui dire)
 Patrick Descamps – This Is Our Land (Chez nous)
 David Murgia – Blind Spot (Dode Hoek)

Best Supporting Actress
 Aurora Marion – A Wedding (Noces)
 Isabelle de Hertogh – 150 Milligrams (La Fille de Brest)
 Lucie Debay – The Confession (La Confession)
 Yolande Moreau – A Woman's Life (Une vie)

Most Promising Actor
 Soufiane Chilah – Blind Spot (Dode Hoek)
 Mistral Guidotti – Home
 Baptiste Sornin – Sonar
 Arieh Worthalter – Past Imperfect (Le Passé devant nous)

Most Promising Actress
 Maya Dory – Angel (Mon ange)
 Adriana de Fonseca – Even Lovers Get the Blues
 Fantine Harduin – Happy End
 Lena Suijkerbuik – Home

Best Screenplay
 Insyriated – Philippe Van Leeuw King of the Belgians – Peter Brosens and Jessica Woodworth
 This Is Our Land (Chez nous) – Lucas Belvaux
 A Wedding (Noces) – Stephan Streker

Best First Feature Film
 Don't Tell Her (Faut pas lui dire) Even Lovers Get the Blues
 Sonar
 Spit 'n' Split
 Staying in the Woods (Je suis resté dans les bois)

Best Flemish Film
 Home
 Cargo
 King of the Belgians
 Racer and the Jailbird (Le Fidèle)

Best Foreign Film in Coproduction
 Raw (Grave) Graduation (Bacalaureat)
 I, Daniel Blake
 Loveless (Nelyubov)

Best Cinematography
 Insyriated – Virginie Surdej Angel (Mon ange) – Juliette Van Dormael
 Raw (Grave) – Ruben Impens

Best Production Design
 Raw (Grave) – Laurie Colson Angel (Mon ange) – Luc Noël
 A Wedding (Noces) – Catherine Cosme

Best Costume Design
 A Wedding (Noces) – Sophie Van Den Keybus King of the Belgians – Claudine Tychon
 Raw (Grave) – Elise Ancion

Best Original Score
 Insyriated – Jean-Luc Fafchamps Racer and the Jailbird (Le Fidèle) – Raf Keunen
 This Is Our Land (Chez nous) – Frédéric Vercheval

Best Sound
 Insyriated – Paul Heymans and Alek Gosse and Chadi Roukoz A Wedding (Noces) – Olivier Ronval and Michel Schillings
 Sonar – Félix Blume, Benoît Biral and Frédéric Meert

Best Editing
 Lost in Paris (Paris pieds nus) – Sandrine Deegen Home – Nico Leunen
 Racer and the Jailbird (Le Fidèle) – Alain Dessauvage
 This Is Our Land (Chez nous) – Ludo Troch
 A Wedding (Noces) – Jérôme Guiot

Best Live Action Short Film
 With Thelma (Avec Thelma) Kapitalistis
 Little Hands (Les Petites Mains)
 The Summer Movie (Le Film de l'été)

Best Animated Short Film
 Le Lion et le Singe
 69 sec
 The Unicorn (La Licorne)
 The Wind in the Reeds (Le Vent dans les roseaux)

Best Documentary Film
 Burning Out
 The Belgian Road to Cannes (La Belge Histoire du festival de Cannes)
 Children of Chance (Enfants du hasard)
 Still Alive (Rester vivants)

Honorary Magritte Award
 Sandrine Bonnaire

Films with multiple nominations and awards

The following fourteen films received multiple nominations.

 Eight: A Wedding
 Seven: This Is Our Land
 Six: Insyriated
 Five: King of the Belgians, Racer and the Jailbird
 Four: Blind Spot, Home, Raw
 Three: Angel, Lost in Paris, Sonar
 Two: Don't Tell Her, Even Lovers Get the Blues, Just to Be Sure

The following three films received multiple awards.
 Six: Insyriated
 Two: Raw and A Wedding

See also

 43rd César Awards
 23rd Lumières Awards
 2017 in film

References

External links
 
 

2018
2017 film awards
2018 in Belgium